InterTV Grande Minas (channel 4) is a television station licensed to Montes Claros, Minas Gerais, Brazil and affiliated with TV Globo. The station broadcasts in the Northern part of the Noroeste, Central and the Jequitinhonha and Mucuri of Minas Gerais. Operates on VHF channel 4, in its headquarters city, Montes Claros / MG. Belongs to the Rede InterTV.
The presenters of the station's newscasts are Cácio Xavier, Dennis Delano and Selma Goncalves.

Headquarters 
Montes Claros

Journalists  
 Productors 
Cecília Oliveira
Iran Ferreira
Leonídia Rodrigues
Tiago Severino
Rafael Faria

 Reporters 
 Denis Delano
 João Edwar
 Cácio Xavier
 Délio Pinheiro
 Natalia Jael
 Ana Carolina Ferreira

 Editors
 Larissa Bernardes
 Valéria Almeida
 Cácio Xavier
 João Edwar

 Coordinator of Journalism
 Lilian Câmara

 Gerent of Journalism
 Cácio Xavier

Major cities in their coverage area 
 Montes Claros - Channel 4 
 Brasília de Minas - Channel 5 
 Januária - Channel 9 
 Unaí - Channel 11 
 Curvelo - Channel 8 
 Turmalina - Channel 13 
 Janaúba - Channel 7 
 São João da Ponte
 São Francisco - Channel 4 
 Pirapora - Channel 44 
 Salinas - Channel 4 
 Três Marias
 Teófilo Otoni

Television networks in Brazil
TV Globo affiliates